Pouteria espinae is a species of plant in the family Sapotaceae. It is endemic to Colombia.

References

espinae
Endemic flora of Colombia
Taxonomy articles created by Polbot
Taxa named by Charles Baehni
Taxa named by Paul Carpenter Standley

Least concern plants